Eugene Anthony Valencia Jr. (13 April 1921 – 15 September 1972) was a 3rd highest scoring United States Navy fighter ace in World War II with 23 claims.

Early life
A native of San Francisco, Valencia was born on 13 April 1921 and attended junior college before enlisting in the United States Navy for flight training in 1941.

Naval career
Valencia received his wings in February 1942 and joined Fighting Squadron 9 a year later. At the end of the first cruise in February 1944, Lieutenant (JG) Valencia was an ace with seven victories, including three in the large dogfight over Truk Atoll on 17 February.

Promoted to full lieutenant, Valencia prepared for VF-9's next deployment. He trained three other pilots in his "mowing machine" tactics, which became perhaps the deadliest naval fighter division (four planes) of the war. Valencia himself joined the ranks of the "aces in a day" with six kills over Japan on 17 April, and at war's end all his division's pilots were aces. James B. French had 11 victories, Harris Mitchell 10, and Clinton L. Smith 6. With 23 victories, Valencia remains the United States Navy's third-ranking ace of all time.

Valencia remained in the navy after World War II ended, and served in a variety of roles including ordnance test, transports, and antisubmarine warfare. As a full commander, he was executive officer of VFAW-3, an air defense squadron, from 1958–1960.

Valencia's decorations include the Navy Cross, six Distinguished Flying Crosses, and six Air Medals.

Later life
Valencia retired from the navy in 1962 and entered business in Southern California. He died at an aces reunion in San Antonio in 1972, aged 51.

References

Bibliography

 Olynyk, Frank. Stars & Bars: A Tribute to the American Fighter Ace 1920–1972. London: Grub Street, 1993
 Tillman, Barrett. Hellcat Aces of World War 2. London: Osprey Publishing, 1996. 

United States Navy personnel of World War II
American World War II flying aces
Aviators from California
People from San Francisco
Recipients of the Distinguished Flying Cross (United States)
Recipients of the Navy Cross (United States)
Recipients of the Air Medal
United States Navy officers
1921 births
1972 deaths
Military personnel from California